Scott Keach (born 21 April 1965) is an Australian equestrian who competed at the 1988 Summer Olympics in the three-day event. In 2016, he was again named to compete at the Olympics, this time in the show jumping.  The 28-year gap between Olympics was a record for Australia.

Originally from Currency Creek  in South Australia, Keach now lives in Ocala, Florida.

References

External links
Profile at the International Federation for Equestrian Sports

1965 births
Australian male equestrians
Living people
Olympic equestrians of Australia
Equestrians at the 1988 Summer Olympics
Recipients of the Australian Sports Medal
Equestrians at the 2016 Summer Olympics
20th-century Australian people
21st-century Australian people